Allen Payne (born Allen Roberts on July 7, 1968) is an American actor. He is best known for his role as Jason Alexander in the 1994 drama film Jason's Lyric, as well as his portrayal of C.J. Payne on the family sitcom Tyler Perry's House of Payne (2006–2012, 2020-present). Payne is also known for his portrayal of Lance Rodman on NBC's The Cosby Show during its final two seasons. On film, Payne also played Gerald "Gee Money" Wells in the 1991 film New Jack City, and Detective Justice in the 1995 film Vampire in Brooklyn.

Life and career
Payne was born Allen Roberts in the Harlem area of New York City, the eldest son of Allen Roberts and Barbara Reeves. He attended Pennsauken High School in Pennsauken Township, New Jersey.

Payne's first television role was in a 1990 episode of The Cosby Show. Over the span of two seasons, he portrayed Charmaine's boyfriend, Lance Rodman. Payne subsequently appeared in episodes of The Fresh Prince Of Bel-Air and Malcolm & Eddie.

Payne has appeared in many films. He played "Dead Mike" in the Nelson George-produced and George and Chris Rock-written hip-hop parody CB4. He also appeared in New Jack City, Jason's Lyric, Vampire in Brooklyn, Double Platinum, and The Perfect Storm. Beginning in 2006, he starred as C.J. Payne on Tyler Perry's House of Payne. He also appeared in a Stacy Lattisaw video I'm Not The Same Girl.

In 2018, he reprised his role from House of Payne on The Paynes.

In 2022, he also stars and reprised his role as "Gee Money" in the stage adaptation of New Jack City: Live on Stage, produced by playwright Je'Caryous Johnson.

Filmography

Film/Movie

Television

References

External links
 
 

1968 births
Living people
Male actors from New Jersey
Male actors from New York City
Pennsauken High School alumni
People from Pennsauken Township, New Jersey
American male film actors
American male television actors
People from Harlem
African-American male actors
20th-century American male actors
21st-century American male actors
20th-century African-American people
21st-century African-American people